Isak Andic Ermay (born 1953) is a Spanish billionaire businessman, the founder and largest shareholder in the clothing retail chain Mango.

Early life
Born to a Sephardic Jewish family in Istanbul, Turkey, Andic's family emigrated from Turkey to Barcelona, Spain in 1969 where he and his brother Nahman began selling hand-embroidered T-shirts and clogs. They opened shops in Barcelona and Madrid, first selling their own brand (Isak jeans) and then stocking other brands. In 1984, he joined with fellow entrepreneur Enric Cusí and his brother and re-denominated all their stores under the name Mango. Andic chose the name "Mango" after tasting the fruit on a trip to the Philippines and because the word is pronounced the same in every language.

In 2006, Andic was appointed the director of Banco Sabadell and in 2012, he became its single largest shareholder with a 7% ownership interest. According to Forbes, Andic has a net worth of $4.8 billion, as of January 2015. Mango has 2,400 stores in 107 countries.

Membership 
Isak Andic is member of IESE's International Advisory Board (IAB).

Personal life
Andic is divorced from Neus Raig Tarragó with whom he has three children:  (born 1981) who was named his successor in 2012; Judith Andic (born 1984), who also works for Mango; and Sarah Andic (born 1997). Also, he had a relationship with the catalan stylist Zenaida Bufill Comadrán. Andic lives in Barcelona.

References 

1953 births
Living people
Spanish billionaires
Spanish Jews
Turkish Jews
Turkish expatriates in Spain
People from Barcelona
20th-century Spanish businesspeople
21st-century Spanish businesspeople
Mizrahi Jews